Elizabeth McGrath may refer to:

 Elizabeth McGrath (artist), American artist nicknamed Bloodbath McGrath
 Elizabeth McGrath (art historian) (born 1945), British art historian and academic
 Elizabeth McGrath (dancer), American ballerina

See also
 Mary Elizabeth McGrath Blake